Robert Kłos (born 4 February 1982 in Złotoria) is a retired Polish footballer (midfielder).

Career

Club
In February 2011, he joined Elana Toruń on a half year contract.

References

External links
  

1982 births
Living people
Polish footballers
Sparta Brodnica players
Zagłębie Lubin players
Widzew Łódź players
Odra Wodzisław Śląski players
Elana Toruń players
People from Toruń County
Sportspeople from Kuyavian-Pomeranian Voivodeship
Association football midfielders